The 3rd Class (translit. Al-Darja Al-Thalitha) is a 1988 Egyptian drama/romance movie, starring Soad Hosni and Ahmed Zaki.

Cast
Soad Hosni as Na'ana'a.
Ahmed Zaki
Gamil Ratib
 Sanaa’ Younis
 Abdel Azim Abdel Hak

See also 
 Egyptian films of the 1980s
 List of Egyptian films of 1988

References
(Al Daraga Al Thalesa):
"الدرجة الثالثة (فيلم(":ar:الدرجة الثالثة (فيلم)

20th-century Egyptian films
1988 films
1980s Arabic-language films